Collège Lionel-Groulx is a general and vocational college (CEGEP) located in Sainte-Thérèse, Quebec, Canada. The college has about 5,200 full-time students and 2,000 continuing education students.

History

The college traces its origins to the merger of several institutions which became public ones in 1967, when the Quebec system of CEGEPs was created. The college was established September 14, 1967 and named in honour of the Quebec historian Lionel Groulx, a former student of the Seminary of St. Therese. Schools include the St. Rose Business School, the Normal School of St. Jerome and the Seminary of St. Therese. On October 8, 1968, the school was subject to a strike, which led to student mobilizations of October 1968. In 1969, the college acquired all the assets and property of the Seminary of Ste-Thérèse. At the end of the 1960s, a teaching reform led to the opening of the theatre school, one of two integrated into junior colleges.

Facilities

The college also has an arena, a sports center, a building complex consisting of traditional houses and apartments to accommodate 280 students, a house computer, and a college center for technology transfer (Innovation Centre Microelectronics Quebec), a theater wing, a music wing, an auditorium, a training center in agriculture and horticulture in greenhouses in Mirabel.

Programs
The college offers two types of programs: pre-university and technical. The pre-university programs, which take two years to complete, cover the subject matters, which roughly correspond to the additional year of high school given elsewhere in Canada in preparation for a chosen field in university. The technical programs, which take three years to complete, applies to students who wish to be career-ready; however, many students choose to pursue a university degree. In addition, the Continuing Education Centre offers a wide variety of credit courses and programs with flexible scheduling.

Partnerships
The College of General and Vocational Education is affiliated with the ACCC, and CCAA. The General Association of Students of the College Lionel-Groulx (AGEECLG) is a member of the Association for Student Union Solidarity (ASSÉ), and it has about 5,200 students.

Athletics
The sport teams, which are named the Nordiques, participate in the Canadian Colleges Athletic Association.

General directors
Charles Valois (1967-1973)
Desgroseilliers Pierre (1973-1978)
Nicole Brodeur (1978-1981)
Jean Ladouceur (1981-1984)
André Turcotte (1987-1991)
Marie-Hélène Desrosiers (1991-1995)
Francine Sénecal (1995-2002)
Monique Laurin (2002 -)

Notable alumni
Normand Brathwaite, performer
Julie Crochetière, performer
Guy Jodoin, performer
Charline Labonté, ice hockey player
Gilles Valiquette, performer
Marc Nadon, judge

See also

List of colleges in Quebec
Higher education in Quebec

References

External links
 Collège Lionel-Groulx website  (French)
 Lionel-Groulx General Association of Students (AGEECLG) (French)
 CIMEQ CCTT website (French)

Buildings and structures in Laurentides
Education in Laurentides
Educational institutions established in 1967
Lionel-Groulx
Sainte-Thérèse, Quebec
Colleges in Quebec